Thaw Nandar Aung (born 1999), known as Han Lay, is a Burmese beauty pageant titleholder, model, and pro-democracy activist. Han was crowned Miss Grand Myanmar 2020 and represented Myanmar at Miss Grand International 2020, where she finished in the Top 20.

Early life and education
Han Lay was born on 1999 in Myawaddy. She has graduated with a degree in psychology from Yangon University.

Pageantry

Han competed at Miss Universe Myawaddy 2019 representing Myawaddy, where she won the title, at Miss Universe Myanmar 2020.

On 30 December 2020, Han Lay was crowned as first runner-up of Miss Universe Myanmar 2020 by outgoing titleholder Hmwe Thet.

Miss Grand International 2020
She represented Myanmar at the Miss Grand International 2020 pageant which was held in Thailand. She was placed in the top 20 and also won five special awards How to eat Thai food in 2 minute, How to get to know you in 1 minute,Pre-Arrival, Queen with the Golden Crown (top 10) and Best in Swimsuit (top 20).

Anti-junta activism 
Han is a supporter of the pro-democracy movement in Myanmar and criticized the Burmese military junta, which has killed more than 1000 Myanmar citizens in Miss Grand International 2020. Her speech was gone viral throughout the world and made the world more focused on what's happening in her country.

Han took refuge in Thailand in 2021, and in 2022 was reportedly denied re-entry into Thailand after visiting Vietnam. She reportedly spent one night in a detention room. She worked with the United Nations High Commissioner for Refugees (UNHCR) for seeking political asylum in Canada. On 27 September 2022, Han Lay departed from Thailand to Canada after being granted the asylum status in the mentioned country. 

She is now residing in Prince Edward Island, Canada, and has been travelling to different provinces, in the country such as British Colombia, Ontario, Québec, and Edmonton, to organize charity and fundraising events to help causes in her home country, Myanmar.

References

External links

2000 births
Burmese beauty pageant winners
Burmese democracy activists
Burmese female models
Burmese women activists
Fugitives wanted by Myanmar
Living people
Miss Grand Myanmar
Miss Grand International contestants